Erik Frandsen is an American actor and singer-songwriter who is associated with the Greenwich Village folk scene. He frequently shared the stage with Dave Van Ronk, and collaborated with the Coen Brothers in the filming of Inside Llewyn Davis, based on Van Ronk.

Frandsen co-composed the score for the 1991 off-Broadway musical Song of Singapore.

Later in life, Frandsen picked up acting and played in Law & Order episodes, and also played a recurring character at The Colbert Report, the fictional German ambassador to the UN Hans Beinholtz. In 2013, Frandsen voiced Andy Moon in Grand Theft Auto V. He also played as the Political Expert in The Onion's "Tea party quiet... Too quiet".

Filmography

References

External links
 
 

Living people
Place of birth missing (living people)
American male actors
Year of birth missing (living people)
American male singer-songwriters
American singer-songwriters